M25 or M-25 may be:

Aerospace
 M-25 Dromader Mikro, a variant of the Polish PZL-Mielec M-18 Dromader agricultural aircraft
 Cors-Air M25Y Black Devil, an Italian aircraft engine
 Shvetsov M-25, an aircraft radial engine produced in the Soviet Union (USSR) in the 1930s and 1940s

Motor vehicles
 M25 Tank Transporter, a US Army World War II tractor-trailer combination used for transporting/recovering tanks
 M25, the engine of the Mercedes-Benz W25 GP race car (1934–1936)
 M25, a Nissan-based car by Tommy Kaira

People
M25 cat killer, alleged killer of 50+ cats in the Croydon, England area

Roads
 M-25 (Michigan highway), a road connecting Port Huron and Bay City
 M25 highway (Russia), a federal road in Russia that connects Novorossiysk with the ferry at Simferopol to Crimea
 M25 (East London), a Metropolitan Route in East London, South Africa
 M25 (Cape Town), a Metropolitan Route in Cape Town, South Africa
 M25 (Pretoria), a Metropolitan Route in Pretoria, South Africa
 M25 (Durban), a Metropolitan Route near Durban, South Africa
 M25 motorway, orbital road around Greater London

Space
 Messier 25, an open star cluster in the constellation Sagittarius

Vessels
 HMS M25, a British warship launched in 1915 and scuttled in 1919
Mälar 25, sailboat class
 Miles M.25 Martinet, a 1942 target tug aircraft of the Royal Air Force

Weapons
 M25 sniper rifle, a sniper rifle
 M25A1 grenade, a U.S. riot control hand grenade
 XM25 CDTE, an airburst grenade launcher